Sparsh (English: Touch) is a 1980 Indian Hindi feature film directed by Sai Paranjpye. It stars Naseeruddin Shah and Shabana Azmi playing the characters of a visually impaired principal and a sighted teacher in a school for the blind, where they fall in love though soon their complexes tag along and they struggle to get past them to reconnect with the "touch" of love. The film remains most memorable for the subtle acting of its leads, plus the handling of the issue of relationships with the visually disabled, revealing the emotional and perception divide between the worlds of the "blind" and the "sighted", epitomized by the characters. The film won the National Film Award for Best Feature Film in Hindi. However, the film's release was delayed by almost 4 years.

The film won numerous awards including National Film Award – Best Actor for  Naseeruddin Shah, while Sai Paranjpye got the Best Screenplay. At the Filmfare Awards, it won the top two: that of Best Movie and Filmfare Award – Best Director, plus a Best Dialogue Award for Sai Paranjpye. Further, Shabana Azmi was nominated for Best Actress, which she eventually won for the film Bhavna.

Synopsis 
This film is about the blind, in particular about the lives and feelings of blind children and the principal of their school. Sparsh refers to the sensation and feeling of touch upon which blind people rely in the absence of sight.

The story opens with Anirudh Parmar (Naseeruddin Shah) as the principal of Navjivan Andhvidyalay, a school for the blind that educates about 200 blind children. Anirudh has a dark and lonely existence for the most part. One day, while on his way to the doctor, he hears a lovely song and ends up mesmerized at the singer's door instead of the doctor.

The voice belongs to Kavita Prasad (Shabana Azmi), a young woman recently widowed after three years of marriage. Kavita, too, prefers a secluded existence. Her childhood friend Manju, is the only friend she has.

Manju throws a small party where Kavita and Anirudh meet again. He recognizes her from her voice. During the conversation, he mentions that the school is looking for volunteers to read, sing, teach handicrafts and spend time with the children. Kavita is reluctant, but she is urged by Manju and her husband Suresh to strongly consider it. Kavita decides to volunteer.

As Kavita spends more time at the school, she begins forming a friendship with Anirudh. The friendship grows stronger over time and they become engaged. But their personalities and feelings are different. Anirudh is of strong character. He firmly believes that the blind need help but not pity or charity. (When once, in his office, Kavita attempts to assist him with coffee, he gets enraged at the thought of his guest offering to overcome his obvious difficulty with hospitality.) Kavita, recently bereaved, looks to the school (and Anirudh) as a way towards an ideal, one of sacrificial service. Anirudh gets wind of this and assumes Kavita is simply seeking to fill the void in her life with this form of service. He assumes she accepted the proposal, not out of love, but as a sacrifice towards a way out of her dark life. During this time, Anirudh's fellow blind friend Dubey (Om Puri) laments that his recently deceased wife was not happy in their marriage.

Anirudh is shaken, confused, and disturbed by all this. He breaks off the engagement (but does not mention the reason to Kavita). She accepts his decision.

Kavita, now a salaried employee of the school, continues to help the children. The initial coldness between her and Anirudh gives way to friction and eventually, over a series of events at the school, brings up the feelings they were not able to discuss before. The situation spirals downward and one of them must leave the school.

The movie ends with Anirudh and Kavita being touched by the depth of their feelings for one another and finally seeing a way out.

Cast
 Shabana Azmi – Kavita
 Naseeruddin Shah – Anirudh Parmar
 Sudha Chopra – Manjul
 Mohan Gokhale – Jagdish
 Pran Talwar		
 Arun Joglekar		
 Om Puri – Dubey

Production

Filming 
Much of the film was shot at the Blind Relief Association in New Delhi and the character of Anirudh is modelled on Mr Mittal, who was the headmaster of the Blind Relief Association.

Awards
27th National Film Awards:
 Best Feature Film in Hindi – Basu Bhattacharya and Sai Paranjpye
Best Actor – Naseeruddin Shah
 Best Screenplay – Sai Paranjpye
32nd Filmfare Awards:

Won

 Best Film – Basu Bhattacharya
 Best Director – Sai Paranjpye
 Best Dialogue – Sai Paranjpye

Nominated

 Best Actor – Naseeruddin Shah
 Best Actress – Shabana Azmi

Music
Sparsh's music is by veteran music director Kanu Roy and lyrics are by Indu Jain.

References

External links 
 

1980 films
1980s Hindi-language films
1980 drama films
Films featuring a Best Actor National Award-winning performance
Films scored by Kanu Roy
Films whose writer won the Best Original Screenplay National Film Award
Best Hindi Feature Film National Film Award winners
1980 directorial debut films
Films directed by Sai Paranjpye